Fit-fit or fir-fir ( fitfit; ፍርፍር firfir), (Oromo: chechebsaa), is an Eritrean and Ethiopian food typically served as breakfast. Fit-fit is served by preparing sauce and shredding injera or kitcha into pieces and mixing the two. It is generally made with shredded flat bread, spiced clarified butter, and the hot spice berbere.  There are two main varieties of fit-fit depending on the type of flatbread being used: the sourdough injera  and the unleavened kitcha.

Injera fit-fit
Injera fit-fit (enjera fetfet; also taita fit-fit in Tigrinya) is a combination of shredded injera, berbere, onions, and clarified butter. Variations on this basic recipe are common in which the name of the additional item is commonly used as a prefix (e.g. injera with shiro (chickpea puree), is called shiro fit-fit).

In Eritrea, leftover meat sauces (zighni or tsebhi) are often added to injera fit-fit and served for breakfast with raw chili peppers and yoghurt on the side. Similarly, in Ethiopia, leftover wat is used as a main ingredient along with injera.

Injera fit-fit can be eaten with a spoon when served in a bowl or eaten with the right hand when served atop of another piece of injera as is typical in Ethiopian or Eritrean cuisine.

Kitcha fit-fit

Kitcha fit-fit (variations in Ethiopia: kitta fer-fer, kita fir-fir; widely known by its Oromo name chechebsa) is a combination of shredded kitcha (Tigrinya) or kitta (Amharic), berbere, and clarified butter. Kitcha fit-fit is sometimes eaten with plain yogurt (urgo in Amharic and rug-o in Tigrinya). Unlike most Ethiopian foods, it is eaten with a utensil (usually a spoon).

See also

 List of African dishes
 List of bread dishes
 List of Ethiopian dishes and foods

References

Eritrean cuisine
Ethiopian cuisine
Bread dishes